A TV tuner card is a kind of television tuner that allows television signals to be received by a computer. Most TV tuners also function as video capture cards, allowing them to record television programs onto a hard disk much like the digital video recorder (DVR) does.

 The interfaces for TV tuner cards are most commonly either PCI bus expansion card or the newer PCI Express (PCIe) bus for many modern cards, but PCMCIA, ExpressCard, or USB devices also exist. In addition, some video cards double as TV tuners, notably the ATI All-In-Wonder series. The card contains a tuner and an analog-to-digital converter (collectively known as the analog front end) along with demodulation and interface logic. Some lower-end cards lack an onboard processor and, like a Winmodem, rely on the system's CPU for demodulation.

Types
There are many types of tuner cards.

Analog tuners
Analog television cards output a raw video stream, suitable for real-time viewing but ideally requiring some sort of video compression if it is to be recorded.

Some cards also have analog input (composite video or S-Video) and many also provide a radio tuner.

An early example was the Aapps Corp. MicroTV for Apple Macintosh II, which debuted in 1989.

More-advanced TV tuners encode the signal to Motion JPEG or MPEG, relieving the main CPU of this load.

Digital tuners

Hybrid tuners
A hybrid tuner has one tuner that can be configured to act as an analog tuner or a digital tuner. Switching between the systems is fairly easy, but cannot be done immediately.  The card operates as a digital tuner or an analog tuner until reconfigured.

Combo tuners

This is similar to a hybrid tuner, except there are two separate tuners on the card. One can watch analog while recording digital, or vice versa. The card operates as an analog tuner and a digital tuner simultaneously. The advantages over two separate cards are cost and utilization of expansion slots in the computer. As many regions around the world convert from analog to digital broadcasts, these tuners are gaining popularity.

Like the analog cards, the Hybrid and Combo tuners can have specialized chips on the tuner card to perform the encoding, or leave this task to the CPU. The tuner cards with this 'hardware encoding' are generally thought of as being higher quality. Small USB tuner sticks have become more popular in 2006 and 2007 and are expected to increase in popularity. These small tuners generally do not have hardware encoding due to size and heat constraints.

While most TV tuners are limited to the radio frequencies and video formats used in the country of sale, many TV tuners used in computers use DSP, so a firmware upgrade is often all that's necessary to change the supported video format. Many newer TV tuners have flash memory big enough to hold the firmware sets for decoding several different video formats, making it possible to use the tuner in many countries without having to flash the firmware. However, while it is generally possible to flash a card from one analog format to another due to the similarities, it is generally not possible to flash a card from one digital format to another due to differences in decode logic necessary.

Radio tuners
Many TV tuners can function as FM radios; this is because there are similarities between broadcast television and FM radio. The FM radio spectrum is close to (or even inside) that used by VHF terrestrial TV broadcasts. And many broadcast television systems around the world use FM audio. So listening to an FM radio station is simply a case of configuring existing hardware.

Mobile TV adapter
External TV tuner card attachments are available for mobile phone handsets like the iPhone, for watching mobile TV, via TV stations on 1seg in Japan (SoftBank), and for soon for the proprietary subscription-based MediaFLO in the U.S. (Qualcomm).  There is also a "converter" for watching DVB-H in Europe and elsewhere via WiFi streaming video (PacketVideo).

Video capture 
Video capture cards are a class of video capture devices designed to plug directly into expansion slots in personal computers and servers. Models from many manufacturers are available; all comply with one of the popular host bus standards including PCI, newer PCI Express (PCIe) or AGP bus interfaces.

These cards typically include one or more software drivers to expose the cards' features, via various operating systems, to software applications that further process the video for specific purposes. As a class, the cards are used to capture baseband analog composite video, S-Video, and, in models equipped with tuners,  RF modulated video. Some specialized cards support digital video via digital video delivery standards including Serial Digital Interface (SDI) and, more recently, the emerging HDMI standard. These models often support both standard definition (SD) and high definition (HD) variants.

While most PCI and PCI-Express capture devices are dedicated to that purpose, AGP capture devices are usually included with the graphics adapted on the board as an all-in-one package. Unlike video editing cards, these cards tend to not have dedicated hardware for processing video beyond the analog-to-digital conversion. Most, but not all, video capture cards also support one or more channels of audio. New technologies allow PCI-Express and HD-SDI to be implemented on video capture cards at lower costs than before.

An early example is the Mass Microsystems Colorspace FX card from 1989.

Applications
There are many applications for video capture cards like EasyCap including converting a live analog source into some type of analog or digital media, (such as a VHS tape to a DVD), archiving, video editing, scheduled recording (such as a DVR), television tuning, or video surveillance. The cards may have significantly different designs to optimally support each of these functions. Capture cards can be used for recording a video game longplay (LP) so gamers can make walkthrough gameplay videos.

One of the most popular applications for video capture cards is to capture video and audio for live Internet video streaming. The live stream can also be simultaneously archived and formatted for video on demand. The capture cards used for this purpose are typically purchased, installed, and configured in host PC systems by hobbyists or systems integrators. Some care is required to select suitable host systems for video encoding, particularly HD applications which are more affected by CPU performance, number of CPU cores, and certain motherboard characteristics that heavily influence capture performance.

See also 
 Comparison of PVR software packages
 Digital video recorder
 Frame grabber
 TV gateway

References

External links 
 "PC Project: Choosing a TV tuner card to record digital TV".pcauthority.com.au, Retrieved 9 January 2011

Computing input devices
Set-top box
Television technology